This is a list of the Imaginary Conversations of Walter Savage Landor, a series of dialogues of historical and mythical characters. It follows the retrospective order and arrangement of the five-volume collection, chosen by Landor himself and to be found in his Collected Works. These were then published separately (1883).

The original spelling and use of honorifics and titles is retained, but some names are made fuller in order to disambiguate.

First Series: Classical Dialogues

Greek
Achilles and Helen of Troy
Aesop and Rhodopè (two)
Solon and Pisistratus
Anacreon and Polycrates
Xerxes and Artabanus
Pericles and Sophocles
Diogenes and Plato
Xenophon and Cyrus the Younger
Alcibiades and Xenophon
Demosthenes and Eubulides (two)
Aeschines and Phocion
Alexander and the Priest of Hammon
Aristoteles and Callisthenes
Epicurus, Leontion, and Ternissa
Epicurus and Metrodorus
Menander and Epicurus (two)
Lucian and Timotheus

Roman

Marcellus and Hannibal
P. Scipio Aemilianus, Polybius, Panaetius
Metellus and Marius
Lucullus and Caesar
Marcus Tullius Cicero and Quinctus Cicero
Tibullus and Messala
Tiberius and Vipsania
Epictetus and Seneca
Virgilius and Horatius
Asinius Pollio and Licinius Calvus

Second Series: Dialogues of Sovereigns and Statesmen

Richard I and the Abbot of Boxley
Henry IV and Sir Arnold Savage
Oliver Cromwell and Walter Noble
James I and Isaac Casaubon
Peter Leopold and President Du Paty
Kosciusko and Poniatowski
Wolfgang and Henry of Melctal
George Washington and Benjamin Franklin
Andrew Hofer, Count Metternich, and the Emperor Francis
Lord Chesterfield and Lord Chatham
Romilly and Perceval
Peter the Great and Alexis
Louis XIV and Father La Chaise
Soliman and Mufti
Mr. Pitt and Mr. Canning
Archbishop Boulter and Philip Savage
Mahomet and Sergius
Fra Filippo Lippi and Pope Eugenius IV
William Wallace and Edward I
William Penn and Lord Peterborough
Nicolas and Michel
The Duke of Wellington and Sir Robert Inglis
Bishop Shipley and Benjamin Franklin
Windham and Sheridan
Louis XVIII and Talleyrand
Romilly and Wilberforce
Oliver Cromwell and Sir Oliver Cromwell
Admiral Blake and Humphrey Blake

Third Series: Dialogues of Literary Men
Lord Brooke and Sir Philip Sidney
Robert Southey and Porson (two)
Bishop Burnet and Humphrey Hardcastle
Abbé Jacques Delille and Walter Landor
Middleton and Magliabechi
John Milton and Andrew Marvel
Lord Bacon and Richard Hooker
Samuel Johnson and John Horne Tooke (two)
David Hume and John Home
Alfieri and Salomon the Florentine Jew
Rousseau and Malesherbes
Joseph Scaliger and Montaigne
Boccacio and Petrarca
Chaucer, Boccacio and Petrarca
Isaac Barrow and Isaac Newton
Isaak Walton, Charles Cotton and William Oldways
Machiavelli and Michel-Angelo Buonarroti

Fourth Series

Dialogues of Literary Men (continued)
18. Robert Southey and Walter Landor (two)
19. Andrew Marvell and Bishop Parker
20. Steele and Addison
21. La Fontaine and De La Rochefoucauld
22. Melanchthon and Calvin
23. Galileo, John Milton and a Dominican
24. Essex and Edmund Spenser
25. Archdeacon Hare and Walter Landor
26. Alfieri and Metastasio
27. Machiavelli and Guicciardini
28. John Milton and Andrew Marvel (two)
29. Martin and Jack
30. Tiziano Vecelli and Luigi Cornaro.

Dialogues of Famous Women
Queen Elizabeth and Cecil
Roger Ascham and Lady Jane Grey
Henry VIII and Anne Boleyn
Beniowski and Aphanasia
Bossuet and the Duchess of Fontanges
John of Gaunt and Joan of Kent
The Lady Lisle and Elizabeth Gaunt
The Empress Catherine and Princess Dashkof
Leofric and Godiva
The Maid of Orleans and Agnes Sorel
Rhadamistus and Zenobia
Tancredi and Constantia
Princess Mary and Princess Elizabeth
Philip II and Donna Juana Coello
Dante and Beatrice
Queen Elizabeth, Cecil, Duke of Anjou, and De La Motte Fénélon
Mary and Bothwell
Tasso and Cornelia
Vittoria Colonna and Michel-Angelo Buonarroti
The Count Gleichem; the Countess; their children; and Zaida
Dante and Gemma Donati
Leonora di Este and Father Panigarola

Miscellaneous Dialogues
Marchese Pallavicini and Walter Landor
General Kleber and French officers
The Emperor Alexander and Capo D'Istria
Bonaparte and the President of the Senate
General Lascy and the Curate Merino
Cavaliere Puntomichino and Mr. Denis Eusebius Talcranagh
Prince Maurocordato and General Colocotroni
Lopez Baños and Romero Alpuente
Don Victor Saez and El Rey Netto
Lord Coleraine, Rev. Mr. Bloombury, and Rev. Mr. Swan

Fifth Series: Miscellaneous Dialogues (concluded)

11. Duke de Richelieu, Sir Firebrace Cotes, Lady Glengrin. and Mr. Normanby
12. Florentine, English Visitor, and Landor
13. Pope Leo XII and his valet Gigi
14. M. Villele and M. Corbiere
15. Odysseus, Tersitza, Acrive, and Trelawny
16. Don Ferdinand and Don John-Mary-Luis
17. King of the Sandwich Isles, Mr. Peel, Mr. Croker, and Interpreter
18. King of Ava and Rao-Gong-Fao
19. Photo Zavellas and Kaido
20. Miguel and his mother
21. Sandt and Kotzebue
22. The Cardinal-Legate Albani and picture-dealers
23. Blucher and Sandt
24. Eldon and Encombe (courtesy title)
25. Queen Pomare, Pritchard, Captains Polverel and Des Mitrailles, Lieutenant Poignaunez, Mariners
26. Walker, Hattaji, Gonda, and Dewah
27. Talleyrand and Archbishop of Paris
28. Marshal Bugeaud and Arab chieftain
29. Emperor of China and Tsing-Ti
30. Louis Philippe and M. Guizot
31. M. Thiers and M. Lamartine
32. Nicholas, Frederic-William, and Nesselrode
33. Beranger and La Roche-Jaquelin
34. Nicholas and Nesselrode
35. King Carlo-Alberto and Princess Belgioioso
36. Garibaldi and Mazzini
37. Cardinal Antonelli and General Gemeau
38. Louis Bonaparte and Count Molé
39. Pope Pio Nono and Cardinal Antonelli
40. Archbishop of Florence and Francesco Madiai

Landor's Imaginary Conversations
Imaginary Conversations